Blessing Bluff is a prominent rock bluff that marks the eastern end of Staeffler Ridge and overlooks Wilson Piedmont Glacier. It was named by the Advisory Committee on Antarctic Names for Commander George R. Blessing, U.S. Navy, Officer-in-Charge of the Naval Support Force winter-over detachment at McMurdo Station in 1973.

References 

Cliffs of Victoria Land
Scott Coast